Sakuma (written: 佐久間) is a Japanese surname. Notable people with the surname include:

Akira Sakuma (born 1952), Japanese video game designer
, Japanese ice hockey player
Kumi Sakuma (born 1976), Japanese voice actress
Rei Sakuma (born 1965), Japanese voice actress
Roy Sakuma (born 1948), Hawaiian ukulele teacher and founder of the Ukulele Festival
Satoru Sakuma (born 1963), former Japanese football player
Tatsuya Sakuma (born 1974), Japanese professional drifting driver
Tsutomu Sakuma (1879–1910), career naval officer in the Imperial Japanese Navy
Sakuma Hanzō (1844–1897), Japanese photographer
Sakuma Samata (1844–1915), general in the Imperial Japanese Army
Sakuma Shōzan (1811–1864), Japanese politician
Sakuma Morimasa (1554-1583), the son of Sakuma Moritsugu, cousin of Sakuma Nobumori
Sakuma Morishige (died 1560), Japanese samurai who served Oda Nobunaga
Sakuma Nobumori (1528–1582), retainer for the Oda clan

Fictional characters
Ryuichi Sakuma, a character in the anime and manga series Gravitation
Kotaro Sakuma, a character in the Uchu Sentai Kyuranger
Sakuma Kichiro, a character in Age of Empires III: The Asian Dynasties campaign and main protagonist of the japanese campaign...
Sakuya Sakuma (佐久間 咲也), character in A3!
Sakuma Rei and Sakuma Ritsu from Ensemble Stars!

See also
6809 Sakuma, asteroid
Sakuma Dam
Sakuma HVDC Back-to-Back Station
Sakuma drops, a brand for hard candies
Sakuma, Shizuoka, a town

Japanese-language surnames